The Indian Post & Telecommunication Accounts and Finance Service ( IP&TAFS) is a Group "A" Central Civil Services of the Union of India. The Service was started in the year 1972 for prudent and professional management of the finances of the Department of Posts and Department of Telecommunications which were the sole provider of the communications needs of the country at that time. Gradually, over time the service has crystallized into a professional cadre of over 376 officers. In 2017, 25 officers were recruited through prestigious Civil Services Examination conducted by Union Public Service Commission.

Duties performed by Officers of IP&TAFS GR.’A’ 

As in the other Central Services, the officers are liable to be transferred and posted in anywhere in India.  The officers of IP&TAFS are working in Department of Telecom, Department of Posts, and various other ministries and statutory bodies of Govt of India on deputation.

In Department of Telecommunications, the officers are posted at DOT Headquarters as Adviser, Sr DDG, DDG, Directors & ADG. In field units the officers are posted as Controller or Joint Controller of Communication Accounts (CCA/JCCA) which is involved in the collection of License fees and Spectrum Usage Charges from Airtel, Vodafone, Idea, BSNL, MTNL and other service providers and for checking and disbursing claims received under the Universal Service Obligation fund as well as administrative functions such as settlement of pension cases of DoT Employees, maintaining General Provident Fund accounts of DoT Employees, . The amount collected under licensing is approximately Rs.44000 crores for the Financial Year 2017-18. The CCA units also assist in the administration of Universal Service Obligation Fund under the Ministry of Communications & IT for providing telecom service in rural/remote areas of the country involving (a) planning & forecasting, (b) tendering, (c) costing, (d) disbursement of support to service providers, and (e) monitoring. The collection towards USO for the 10th Plan Period is around Rs. 13000 crores.

In the Department of Post, the officers from this service are manning the offices of FA / DDG / GM, Director, ADG /Dy Director / ACAO of Postal Accounts located at DOP Headquarters and in all states. The work in these offices mainly comprises maintaining General Provident Fund accounts of the staff employed in a particular postal circle, settlement of pension cases, checking of money order deliveries and NSCs, budgeting and financial control, Internal Audit of Postal Units and rendering financial advice to the concerned Head of the Circle.

Besides IP&T AFS, Gr. ‘A’ officers can be appointed on deputation to Central Government, State Governments, Central Staffing Scheme, Autonomous Organizations/ Subordinate Organizations, PSUs and UN Organizations/International Organizations like world Bank, Asian Development Bank in various capacities.

Cadre Controlling Authority 

Member Finance, Digital Communication Commission of India, Department of Telecommunications is Cadre Controlling Authority of IP&TAFS), Group "A"& "B". Member Finance is an ex officio Secretary to Government of India. Now Sri Manish Sinha is holding post of Member Finance.

References

External links 
 NICF
 DoT
 DoP 
 CCA, New Delhi 
 CCA. Gujarat 

Accounting in India
Central Civil Services (India)
Postal system of India
Union Public Service Commission